The Beatrix Potter Gallery is a gallery run by the  National Trust and in a 17th-century stone-built house in Hawkshead, Cumbria, England.  It is dedicated to presenting original book illustrations by Beatrix Potter.

On display are original sketches and watercolours painted by Potter for her children's stories as well as artifacts and information relating to her life and work. The display changes annually. The 17th-century building is listed grade II.  It was at one time the law office of Potter's husband, William Heelis. Its interior remains substantially unaltered.

See also
 Hawkshead and Claife
 Hawkshead Grammar School Museum

References

External links

Beatrix Potter Gallery information at the National Trust

Art museums and galleries in Cumbria
Beatrix Potter
Grade II listed buildings in Cumbria
National Trust properties in the Lake District
Museums in Cumbria
Hawkshead